The Pennsylvania Railroad's class E2, E3, E7 steam locomotives were of the 4-4-2 "Atlantic" passenger type, frequently called light Atlantics after the introduction of the heavier E6 Atlantics. All were similar in size and boiler capacity but differed in firebox type, valves and valve gear and cylinder diameter. Classes E2 and E3 were built simultaneously. Fourteen class E2 were similarly converted to class E7sa. Ninety class E2a,d, E3a,d were converted to class E3sd. These improvements allowed many of the engines to remain in active service into the 1930s.

The sub-classes differed as follows:

In the first decade of the twentieth century classes E2 and E3 handled all of the fast passenger trains of the Pennsylvania Railroad. As train weights increased due to the switch to steel passenger cars and more cars per train, the “light” Atlantics were usually doubleheaded. Eventually, as Pacific class K2 and K3 became available, they were relegated to secondary service

Engine #7002

This engine was built in 1902 as a class E2 for the Pennsylvania Railroad as engine No. 7002. (Many doubt the claim; the train averaged about 68 mph from Crestline to Fort Wayne.) No. 7002 was rebuilt to class E7sa in August 1916 and scrapped in 1935. When the PRR was looking for an E7 class locomotive for preservation, they refurbished No. 8063 (an E2a from the PRR) and substituted No. 7002’s engine number and builder’s plate. No. 8063 is a PRR E2a built in 1905. The engine was donated to Railroad Museum of Pennsylvania in 1979 and put into operating order by Strasburg Rail Road where it ran for a number of years, sometimes doubleheading with PRR D16 No. 1223. It last ran on December 20, 1989.

References

Steam locomotives of the United States
4-4-2 locomotives
ALCO locomotives
Baldwin locomotives
Lima locomotives
E2
Railway locomotives introduced in 1916
Standard gauge locomotives of the United States